Malomuynakovo (Malay-Muynaq) is a rural locality (a village) in Mansurovsky Selsoviet, Uchalinsky District, Bashkortostan, Russia. The population was 108 as of 2010. There are 3 streets.

Geography 
Malomuynakovo is located 36 km northeast of Uchaly (the district's administrative centre) by road. Abzakovo is the nearest rural locality.

References 

Rural localities in Uchalinsky District